Arther Lee Love (born September 18, 1977) is a former professional American football tight end for the New England Patriots of the National Football League (NFL). He was drafted in the sixth round of the 2001 NFL Draft.

References

1977 births
Living people
American football tight ends
South Carolina State Bulldogs football players
New England Patriots players
Denver Broncos players
People from Soperton, Georgia